The Minister for Regional Transport and Roads is a minister in the Government of New South Wales who has responsibilities for the development of road infrastructure and road pricing, and taxi and hire car policy and regulation in the regional parts of the state.

In the second Perrottet ministry since December 2021 it is one of six ministries in the transport sector and the Minister, presently Sam Farraway, works with the Minister for Transport, the Minister for Metropolitan Roads, the Minister for Infrastructure, the Minister for Cities and the Minister for Active Transport. Together they administer the portfolio through the Department of Transport (Transport for NSW) and a range of other government agencies that coordinate funding arrangements for transport operators, including hundreds of local and community transport operators.

In the second Perrottet ministry there are four other ministers with specific regional responsibility:

 Minister for Regional New South Wales, Paul Toole
 Minister for Regional Health, Bronnie Taylor
 Minister for Regional Youth, Ben Franklin
 Minister for Western New South Wales, Dugald Saunders.

List of ministers
The following individuals have been appointed as Ministers for Regional Transport and Roads, or any precedent title.

Former ministerial titles

Transport

Roads

See also 

List of New South Wales government agencies

Notes

References

External links 
Transport New South Wales

Regional Transport and Road